Icebreaker is a 2000 action film starring Sean Astin, Stacy Keach and Bruce Campbell and written and directed by David Giancola.

Plot 
Terrorists take over a mountain ski resort with a stolen nuclear weapon and a ski patrolman attempts to stop them.

Home media
The film was released on DVD April 29, 2003.

RiffTrax
The creators of the television series Mystery Science Theater 3000 released a parody audio track for Icebreaker by RiffTrax, which was released in January 2016.

References

External links

Official trailer
AllMovie

2000 films
2000 action films
Films about terrorism
Films about vacationing
American skiing films
2000s English-language films
Rediscovered American films
2000s rediscovered films
2000s American films